Rius Theo "Dick" Esser (9 July 1918 – 8 March 1979) was a Dutch field hockey player who competed in the 1948 Summer Olympics and in the 1952 Summer Olympics. He was born in Makassar, Dutch East Indies.

In 1948 he was a member of the Dutch field hockey team, which won the bronze medal. He played all seven matches as forward.

Four years later he won the silver medal as part of the Dutch team. He played all three matches as forward.

Esser died in Leiden.

External links
 
  Dutch Olympic Committee
Rius Esser profile on DatabaseOlympics.com

1918 births
1979 deaths
Dutch male field hockey players
Olympic field hockey players of the Netherlands
Field hockey players at the 1948 Summer Olympics
Field hockey players at the 1952 Summer Olympics
Olympic silver medalists for the Netherlands
Olympic bronze medalists for the Netherlands
Olympic medalists in field hockey
Sportspeople from Makassar
Medalists at the 1952 Summer Olympics
Medalists at the 1948 Summer Olympics
Dutch people of the Dutch East Indies
20th-century Dutch people